Prior's Park & Adcombe Wood is a 103.6 hectare (256.0 acre) biological Site of Special Scientific Interest south of Pitminster in Somerset, notified in 1952.

Prior's Park and Adcombe Wood have excellent examples of several of the broadleaved semi-natural woodland types associated with the Blackdown Hills. Additional interest lies in the occurrence of several areas of unimproved marshy grassland. This site, which is partly managed by the Somerset Wildlife Trust, is situated on the north facing slopes of the Blackdown Hills, overlooking the Vale of Taunton Deane.

References 

Sites of Special Scientific Interest in Somerset
Sites of Special Scientific Interest notified in 1952
Nature reserves in Somerset
Woodland Sites of Special Scientific Interest
Forests and woodlands of Somerset